H08 is an important Ukraine national highway (H-highway) in Kyiv, Cherkasy, Poltava, Kirovohrad, Dnipropetrovsk, Zaporizhzhia and Donetsk Oblasts.

H08 begins in Boryspil, passes through Pereyaslav, Zolotonosha, Hradyzk, Kremenchuk, Verkhnodniprovsk, Kamianske and Dnipro. Until 9 August 2017, the highway ended in the city of Zaporizhzhia, but a resolution of the Cabinet of Ministers changed its final destination to Mariupol.

In October 2020, work began on the construction of the southern bypass of Dnipro (7 km long). The new road will connect the H08 motorway with the South Bridge, then the M18-E105 international highway, as well as the junction with the new airport.

See also

 Roads in Ukraine
 Ukraine State Highways

References 

Roads in Cherkasy Oblast
Roads in Dnipropetrovsk Oblast
Roads in Donetsk Oblast
Roads in Kirovohrad Oblast
Roads in Kyiv Oblast
Roads in Poltava Oblast
Roads in Zaporizhzhia Oblast